Glåmos is a former municipality in the old Sør-Trøndelag county in Norway. The short-lived municipality existed from 1926 until its dissolution in 1964. It was located in the northern part of what is now the municipality of Røros in Trøndelag county. 

It included all the area around the headwaters of the river Glåma and the areas surrounding the northern and western sides of the lake Aursunden. The administrative centre was the village of Glåmos where Glåmos Church is located.

The municipality had some old copper mines located in the mountains near the village that used to supply the Røros Copper Works in the nearby town of Røros.

History

The parish of Glåmos was established as a municipality in 1926 when the large municipality of Røros was split into four separate municipalities: Glåmos (population: 983), Brekken (population: 1,098), Røros landsogn (population: 701), and the town of Røros (population: 2,284).

During the 1960s, there were many municipal mergers across Norway due to the work of the Schei Committee. On 1 January 1964, the four municipalities of Glåmos (population: 700), Brekken (population: 964), Røros landsogn (population: 482), and the town of Røros (population: 3,063) were all reunited under the name Røros.

Name
The municipal name is a relatively new construction. It was chosen to represent the area around the river Glåma, near the mouth of the lake Aursunden. The first element is based on the name of the river Glåma ( or ) which may mean "loud noise" or "thunder". The last element comes from the Old Norse word  which means "river mouth".

Government
While it existed, this municipality was responsible for primary education (through 10th grade), outpatient health services, senior citizen services, unemployment, social services, zoning, economic development, and municipal roads. During its existence, this municipality was governed by a municipal council of elected representatives, which in turn elected a mayor.

Mayors
The mayors of Glåmos:
 1926–1928: Ole A. Ryen (Bp) 
 1929–1931: Lars S. Rugeldal (Ap)
 1932–1945: Karl O. Erlien (Ap/NS)
 1945–1963: Ingvar Kr. Harborg (Ap)

Municipal council
The municipal council  of Glåmos was made up of 13 representatives that were elected to four year terms. The party breakdown of the final municipal council was as follows:

See also
List of former municipalities of Norway

References

Former municipalities of Norway
Røros
1926 establishments in Norway
1964 disestablishments in Norway